David McKissock is a former association footballer who represented New Zealand at international level.

McKissock made his full All Whites debut in a 0–6 loss to Australia on 14 August 1948 and ended his international playing career with 9 A-international caps and 1 goal to his credit, his final cap and only goal coming in a 6–4 win over Fiji on 7 October 1951.

References 

Year of birth missing (living people)
Living people
New Zealand association footballers
New Zealand international footballers
Association football defenders